FC Septemvri is a Bulgarian football club based in Simitli, which currently plays in the Third League, the third tier of the Bulgarian football league system.

History
The club was founded in 1942. From 1961 to 1975, it was called "Pirin miner". The players at that time were mostly young boys from the age of 18 to 20, with the exception of goalkeeper Dimitar Atanasovski (former player from Belasitsa). The recruited coach was Stoimenov and assistant coach was Radoslav Mitrevski (former player of CSKA Sofia and OFC Pirin Blagoevgrad).

As of 2011, Septemvri is officially affiliated as a satellite to Levski Sofia.
On 15 March 2012, the team reached the 1/2 finals of the Bulgarian Cup for the first time in its history, eliminating Bulgarian powerhouse CSKA Sofia in the quarter-finals by a score of 2:1. They lost in the next round against Ludogorets by a score of 1:4.

Honours
 Sixth place in the Western "B" group: 2010/11 and 2011 /12
 Semifinalist in the National Cup tournament: this time its official name is the Cup of Bulgaria - 2011 /12
 Cup of Amateur Football League: 1994/95

Current squad 

For recent transfers, see Transfers summer 2020.

League positions

Past seasons

References

External links 
 Septemvri Simitli at bgclubs.eu

Football clubs in Bulgaria
1942 establishments in Bulgaria
Association football clubs established in 1942